Joseph P. Folger is former professor of communication at Temple University. Together with Robert A. Baruch Bush, he is the originator, and best known advocate, of the transformative model of mediation.

Bibliography
Working through Conflict: Strategies for Relationships, Groups and Organizations, 3rd Edition (with S. Poole and R.K. Stutman) 
The Promise of Mediation: Responding to Conflict through Empowerment and Recognition 
New directions in mediation (with T. S. Jones).

External links
Google Scholar search result
Temple University profile of Joseph P. Folger
Mediate.com profile of Joseph P. Folger

Temple University faculty
Living people
Year of birth missing (living people)